Finnish People's Party was a minor political party in Finland. The party participated in the 1951 parliamentary elections and got 243 votes (0,01%).

Defunct political parties in Finland